Air Nunavut, trading as Smooth Air, is an airline based in Iqaluit, Nunavut, Canada. It is the only local and Inuit-owned air carrier in the eastern Arctic, operating MEDEVAC and charter services throughout Canada's Arctic, northern Quebec and Greenland. Its main base is Iqaluit Airport.

History
The airline was established and started charter operations in 1989 as Air Baffin. Scheduled services were inaugurated in May 1992.

The airline also has two main bases of operations, Oshawa Executive Airport and Iqaluit Airport.

Three Falcon 10s operate out of the Oshawa Executive Airport under the division company name "SmoothAir Charter." The Beechcraft King Air 200s remain in Iqaluit servicing the surrounding communities.

Fleet
According to Transport Canada the Air Nunavut fleet consists of the following aircraft (as of January 2022):

References

External links

 Air Nunavut / SmoothAir Charter website

Airlines established in 1989
Regional airlines of Nunavut
Transportation in Qikiqtaaluk Region